NGC 6520 is an open cluster in the constellation Sagittarius, superimposed upon the Large Sagittarius Star Cloud. It is magnitude 9.0, diameter 5 arc minutes and class G. It has about 25 stars of magnitude 9 to 12. The dark nebula Barnard 86 lies near its western edge.

References

 Robert Burnham Jr, Burnham's Celestial Handbook: An observer's guide to the universe beyond the solar system, vol 3, p. 1555

External links

Open clusters
Sagittarius (constellation)
6520